Qusum (THDL Romanisation: Chusum) is a small Tibetan town and township in Qusum County in the Shannan Prefecture of Tibet, some 128km from  Lhasa.

References
Wikimapia

See also
List of towns and villages in Tibet
Populated places in Shannan, Tibet
Township-level divisions of Tibet